Kelechi Emeonye, known mononymously as Kelechi or Kelechief, is an American rapper. He rose to prominence in 2014 with the release of the single "Want", off his first EP, Loose Change. In 2016, he won a rap contest sponsored by Mountain Dew's Green Label Sound for "Want". He won Best Song - Dance/Electronica at the 16th Independent Music Award in 2018.

Early life
Kelechi Emeonye was born in Atlanta to Nigerian parents. He is a native of the Igbo people, from the Eastern region of Nigeria. He dropped out of Georgia State University to start a rapping career in his basement at home. In 2015, he opened for Chance, and Wale at Family Matters Tour. In 2016, he won the $50,000 prize for a rap contest sponsored by Mountain Dew's Green Label Sound.

Kelechi started out releasing projects under the stage name "SUBMiT", prior to 2014 he changed his stage name to Kelechi. His musical influence is inspired by the words of Common, the melodies of Nelly, and the charisma of Kanye. He tell's The Masquerade.

Career

In 2014, Kelechi first gained attention from SoundCloud, following the release of his first extended play Loose Change. On 1 December 2016, he released his first studio album Before the Quarter through STNDRD Music, shortly after he won the rap contest. The project lead singles where "Play With My Hair" and " Immigrant Son". On 11 December 2017, he released his second studio album Quarter Life Crisis, with guess appearance from K Camp, VanJess, Phay and Ezi. On 4 April 2018, he released his first mixtape album Woke Up To Winter, and his second mixtape on 29 June 2018, titled Spring Breakup, through STNDRD Music, with guess appearance from Zip K, Phay, and Hanna Lashay. In 2019, he toured with Jidenna, and performed at 85 to Africa tour. On 17 February 2021, he released his third studio album Going Home, with guess appearance on the feature from Jidenna, Phay, and Yungmoonling. On 9 July 2021, Kelechi announced Going Home Nigeria show via Instagram, titled Going Home, Homecoming Concert at Hard Rock Cafe Lagos, on 4 December 2021.

On 5 September 2018, he won Best Song - Dance/Electronica at the Independent Music Awards, via Anish Sood single "Starry Night".

Discography

Singles

Extended play(s)

Studio album(s)

Mixtape(s)

References

External links

Living people
Rappers from Atlanta
Musicians from Atlanta
American people of Nigerian descent
American male songwriters
African-American songwriters
African-American male rappers
Year of birth missing (living people)
21st-century African-American people